Sonderegger is a surname. Notable people with the name include:

Emil Sonderegger (1868–1934), Swiss military officer
Frauke Sonderegger, Swiss orienteering competitor
John L. Sonderegger (1914–1992), American businessman and politician
Katherine Sonderegger, American Episcopal priest
Urs Sonderegger (born 1964), Swiss entrepreneur and racing driver

See also
Cortis & Sonderegger, collaborative team of two Swiss artists, Jojakim Cortis and Adrian Sonderegger
Sonderegger Pine